Arizona serial killer may refer to:

  The Maryvale serial shooter, an accused serial killer who is alleged to have murdered 9 victims from 2015 to 2016. 
  The Baseline Killer, an identified serial killer who operated in 2006 in Phoenix, Arizona
  Dale Hausner and Samuel Dieteman, two serial killers who operated from 2005 to 2006, targeting residential homes in drive-by shootings.